The following is a timeline of labor in New York City from the prehistory of New York City covering the labor of the precolonial era, when the area of present-day New York City was inhabited by Algonquian Native Americans, including the Lenape, to the colonial era, under the Dutch and English, to the American Revolution to modern day New York City.

Prehistory 

 Algonquian communities practiced agriculture, hunting and fishing to sustain themselves.

17th century 
1657: Burgher rights
1659: Baker's strike, concessions
1661: Baker's strike,  suppressed
1677: Carter's strike and prosecution "for not obeying the Command and Doing their Dutyes as becomes them in their Places"
1684: Carter's strike in context of Leisler's Rebellion

18th century
1712: New York Slave Revolt of 1712
1741: Baker's strike
1741: New York Conspiracy of 1741
1768: Journeymen printers strike for "three shillings and six pence per day with diet"

19th century
1805: Journeymen Cordwainers, cf. Commonwealth v. Pullis
1825: United Tailoresses of New York
1827: Abolition of slavery
1829: Working Men's Party of New York
1833: General Trades Union
1836: 
1849: Astor Place Riot
National Cooperative Association of Cordwainers
Tailor's strike
1863: New York City draft riots
1867: Central Labor Union
1882: Labor Day
1886: United Labor Party
1874: Tompkins Square Park riot
1899: Newsboys' strike

20th century
1900: NYC District Council of Carpenters formed
1900: International Ladies Garment Workers Union formed
1901: Newspaper and Mail Deliverers Union formed
1904: National Child Labor Committee formed
1906: Guild of Bookworkers established
1909: New York shirtwaist strike of 1909
1911: Triangle Shirtwaist Factory fire
1911-1927: Labor Slugger Wars
1912: Authors Guild founded as the Authors League of America
1913: Actors' Equity Association
1915: Bagel Bakers Local 338
1916: Teachers Union
1932: 1199: The National Health Care Workers' Union
1933-1942: Artists Union
1935: Negro Labor Committee
1936: American Labor Party
1936: Negro Actors Guild of America formed 
1937: New York City department store strikes
1944: District Council 37
1945: Newspaper and Mail Deliverers Union strike
1946: New York City tugboat strike of 1946
1949: Calvary Cemetery strike
1949: New York City brewery strike
1949: New York City taxicab strike
1953: Waterfront Commission of New York Harbor
1959: New York City Central Labor Council founded
1960: United Federation of Teachers representing most teachers in New York City public schools is founded
1962–1963: New York City newspaper strike
1966: New York City transit strike
1967: Taylor Law
1968: New York City teachers' strike of 1968
1970: Lincoln Hospital takeover
1972: Professional Staff Congress, a trade union representing faculty of the City University of New York campuses, is founded
1977: SEIU 32BJ
1978: New York City newspaper strike
1980: New York City transit strike
1982: Garment workers' strike
1985: UAW Local 2110
1992: Patrolmen's Benevolent Association Riot
1998: Working Families Party
 1199SEIU United Healthcare Workers East
 National Taxi Workers' Alliance
 Graduate Student Organizing Committee

21st century
2005: New York City transit strike
 2011: Occupy Wall Street
 2012: Fight for $15
 2017: Bodega strike
 2019: Amazon HQ2 cancelled
 2021: Amazon Labor Union
 2021–2022: Columbia University strike

References

Business timelines
Labor history of the United States
Timelines of New York City
Labor relations in New York City